Léon Syrovatski (born 28 July 1938) is a former javelin thrower from France, who finished in 18th place in two consecutive Summer Olympics: 1956 and 1960. He set his personal best (76.68 metres) in 1963. He was born in Paris.

Achievements

References
Léon Syrovatski's profile at Sports Reference.com

1938 births
Living people
French male javelin throwers
Athletes (track and field) at the 1956 Summer Olympics
Athletes (track and field) at the 1960 Summer Olympics
Olympic athletes of France
Athletes from Paris
Athletes (track and field) at the 1959 Mediterranean Games
Mediterranean Games gold medalists for France
Mediterranean Games medalists in athletics